Poland  competed at the 2014 Summer Youth Olympics, in Nanjing, China from 16 August to 28 August 2014.

Medalists

Archery

Poland qualified two archers based on its performance at the 2013 World Archery Youth Championships.

Individual

Team

Athletics

Poland qualified 16 athletes.

Qualification Legend: Q=Final A (medal); qB=Final B (non-medal); qC=Final C (non-medal); qD=Final D (non-medal); qE=Final E (non-medal)

Boys
Track & road events

Field Events

Girls
Track & road events

Field events

Badminton

Poland qualified two athletes based on the 2 May 2014 BWF Junior World Rankings.

Singles

Doubles

Basketball

Poland qualified boys team based on its FIBA 3x3 federation ranking.

Boys' Tournament

Roster
 Maciej Bojanowski
 Mateusz Fatz
 Dominik Olejniczak
 Igor Wadowski

Group stage

Knockout Stage

Beach volleyball

Poland qualified a boys' team from their performance at the 2014 CEV Youth Continental Cup Final.

Boxing

Poland qualified one boxer based on its performance at the 2014 AIBA Youth World Championships

Girls

Canoeing

Poland qualified three boats based on its performance at the 2013 World Junior Canoe Sprint and Slalom Championships.

Boys

Girls

Cycling

Poland qualified a boys' and girls' team based on its ranking issued by the UCI.

Team

Mixed Relay

Fencing

Poland qualified four athletes based on its performance at the 2014 FIE Cadet World Championships.

Boys

Girls

Mixed Team

Gymnastics

Artistic Gymnastics

Poland qualified one athlete based on its performance at the 2014 European WAG Championships.

Girls

Judo

Poland qualified two athletes based on its performance at the 2013 Cadet World Judo Championships.

Individual

Team

Modern Pentathlon

Poland qualified one athlete based on its performance at the 2014 Youth A World Championships.

Rowing

Poland qualified two boats based on its performance at the 2013 World Rowing Junior Championships.

Qualification Legend: FA=Final A (medal); FB=Final B (non-medal); FC=Final C (non-medal); FD=Final D (non-medal); SA/B=Semifinals A/B; SC/D=Semifinals C/D; R=Repechage

Sailing

Poland was given a reallocation boat based on being a top ranked nation not yet qualified.

Shooting

Poland was given a wild card to compete.

Individual

Team

Swimming

Poland qualified four swimmers.

Boys

Girls

Table Tennis

Poland qualified two athletes based on its performance at the European Qualification Event.

Singles

Team

Qualification Legend: Q=Main Bracket (medal); qB=Consolation Bracket (non-medal)

Taekwondo

Poland qualified one athlete based on its performance at the Taekwondo Qualification Tournament.

Girls

Tennis

Poland qualified two athletes based on the 9 June 2014 ITF World Junior Rankings.

Singles

Doubles

Weightlifting

Poland qualified 1 quota in the boys' events and 1 quota in the girls' events based on the team ranking after the 2013 Weightlifting Youth World Championships.

Boys

Girls

Wrestling

Poland qualified one athlete based on its performance at the 2014 European Cadet Championships.

Girls

References

2014 in Polish sport
Nations at the 2014 Summer Youth Olympics
Poland at the Youth Olympics